Danny Eugene Morris (born September 25, 1949) is an American former professional baseball player, a left-handed pitcher who appeared in six Major League games for the – Minnesota Twins. He was a top prospect, with a 98 mph fastball until an arm injury ended his career.

Morris played seven seasons (1966–1972) of professional baseball, all in the Twins' organization.  He twice won 16 games in the minor leagues, going 16–8 with an earned run average of 2.16 with the Wisconsin Rapids Twins of the Class A Midwest League in 1966, and 16–15 (3.94) with the Denver Bears of the Triple-A Pacific Coast League in 1968. After the latter season, he received his first trial with the 1968 Twins, working in three September games, two as a starting pitcher, and losing his only decision in a September 18, 1968, starting assignment against the California Angels. Morris spent most of 1969 with Denver, but was recalled by the Twins in June and appeared in three more games. In his only start for the 1969 Twins, he again faced the Angels and again absorbed the defeat, giving up two earned runs and three hits (including a two-run home run by Rick Reichardt) in three innings of work.

As a Major Leaguer, Morris worked in 16 complete innings, allowing 16 hits and nine runs (five earned), with three bases on balls and twenty seven strikeouts.

References

External links
, or Retrosheet, or Pura Pelota (Venezuelan Winter League)

1949 births
Living people
Baseball players from Kentucky
Charlotte Hornets (baseball) players
Cocoa Rookie League Twins
Denver Bears players
Evansville Triplets players
Florida Instructional League Twins players
Major League Baseball pitchers
Melbourne Twins players
Minnesota Twins players
Navegantes del Magallanes players
American expatriate baseball players in Venezuela
People from Greenville, Kentucky
Portland Beavers players
Tacoma Twins players
Tigres de Aragua players
Wisconsin Rapids Twins players